Syringocystadenoma papilliferum is a benign apocrine tumor.

It can arise with nevus sebaceus.

Additional images

See also 
 List of cutaneous conditions
 Hidradenoma papilliferum
 Papillary eccrine adenoma
 List of cutaneous conditions associated with increased risk of nonmelanoma skin cancer

References

External links 

Epidermal nevi, neoplasms, and cysts